Rappa is a surname of Italian origin. Notable people with the surname include:

Elfin Pertiwi Rappa (born 1995), Indonesian beauty pageant titleholder 
Michael Rappa, American analytics professor

References

Surnames of Italian origin